Powell Farm is a historic home located in East Fallowfield Township, Chester County, Pennsylvania. The house was built in 1794, and is a two-story, five bay, fieldstone vernacular Federal style farmhouse.  It has a gable roof and a full width front porch.

It was added to the National Register of Historic Places in 1985.

References

Houses on the National Register of Historic Places in Pennsylvania
Federal architecture in Pennsylvania
Houses completed in 1794
Houses in Chester County, Pennsylvania
National Register of Historic Places in Chester County, Pennsylvania
1794 establishments in Pennsylvania